A doughnut or donut (in American English) is a deep-fried piece of dough or batter, usually with a toroidal shape.

Doughnut or donut may also refer to:

Arts, entertainment, and media
 Donut (Red vs. Blue), Franklin Delano Donut, a fictional character in the comic science-fiction webisode series Red vs. Blue
 Donut, a fictional character from the school system of The Wire TV series
 Donut Media, is an American automotive content brand, known primarily for its eponymous YouTube channel and online merchandise store.
 Donuts (album), a 2006 album by J Dilla
 Dough Nuts (1917), a film starring Oliver Hardy
 "Doughnut" (song), 2021 song by Twice

Computing and science
 DONUT (Direct Observation of the NU Tau, E872), a Fermilab experiment regarding the tau neutrino
 Android Donut, version 1.6 of the Android mobile operating system
 Donuts (company), a corporation formed to acquire and market domain names

Government
 Donut hole (Medicare), an insurance gap where U.S. Medicare drug benefit coverage disappears between specific levels of expenditure on drugs
 Donut Hole Agreement, a 1995 convention around the Bering Sea Donut Hole over a water dispute
 "The Doughnut", the nickname for the headquarters of GCHQ, the British intelligence agency

Other uses
 A geometric shape formally called a torus 
 A torus or toroidal cushion commonly used by hemorrhoid patients
 Baseball doughnut, a baseball bat weight used for warming up
 Doughnut (driving), a driving manoeuver
Doughnut (economic model), a model used to measure economic performance
 Donut, a type of spare tire
 Life donut, a lifebuoy

See also
 
 
 
 
 
 Toroidal (disambiguation)